= Yorkshire St. Pauli =

English football club

Yorkshire St. Pauli is a club established in Leeds for English football supporters of German side St. Pauli.

== History ==
Yorkshire St. Pauli was founded in 2011.
